The 2015 South Oxfordshire District Council election was held on 7 May 2015 to elect members of South Oxfordshire District Council in England. This was on the same day as other local elections.

Elections were held for all seats on the council. After the 2011 South Oxfordshire District Council election the Boundary Commission for England had revised South Oxfordshire's district ward boundaries and reduced the number of seats from 48 to 36. the 2015 elections were the first to be held for the new revised wards.

A total of 96,644 votes were cast at polling stations and 13,527 postal votes were received. This amounted to a 66.5% turnout.

The Conservative Party won 33 of the 36 new seats. The Labour Party, Liberal Democrats and Henley Residents Group each won one seat. No other party or independent candidate won any seats. The Conservative Party kept overall control of the council, with its majority increased to 30.

Summary of results

The Conservative Party's share of votes fell from 53.53% in 2011 to 50.65% in 2015. However, as a result of the new boundaries the Conservatives still won 33 seats in 2015, the same number as in 2011. And as the Boundary Commission had reduced the number of seats, this represents an increase in the share of seats from almost 69% in 2011 to nearly 92% in 2015.

The Labour Party increased its share of votes from 14.92% in 2011 to 16.70% in 2015, overtaking the Liberal Democrats as the party with the second largest number of votes in the district. But as a result of the new ward boundaries and reduced number of wards the number of Labour members on the district council was reduced from four to one.

The Liberal Democrats' share of votes fell from 15.89% in 2011 to 11.93% in 2015. Combined with the new ward boundaries and reduced number of wards, Liberal Democrat members on the district council were reduced from four to one.

In 2011 five independent candidates were elected to the district council. In 2015 four of them did not seek re-election. One, Mark Gray, was a candidate again in 2015 but was not re-elected.

The boundary revision reduced Henley-on-Thames from two wards which each elected two members in 2011, to one ward which elected three members in 2015. Henley Residents Group's share of votes in Henley fell from an average of 37.17% across the two wards in 2011 to 20.43% in the one new ward in 2015. These factors combined to reduce the number of HRG members on the district council from three to one.

In 2011 there was one UK Independence Party candidate, who contested a ward in Didcot. He won 5.09% of the votes in that ward. In 2015 there were 13 UKIP candidates in eight wards. They won an average of 10.91% of votes in the wards that they contested, and 6.48% of the total votes cast in the district, but no seats.

In 2011 there were Green Party candidates in four of the district's 29 wards. They won an average of 16.64% of votes in the wards that they contested, and 3.43% of total votes cast in South Oxfordshire District. In 2015 there were Green Party candidates in 13 of the district's 21 new wards, including three Green candidates in the one new Henley ward. They won an average of 10.21% of votes in the wards that they contested, and 6.43% of total votes cast in the district, but no seats.

The 2015 election increased the Conservative Party majority on the district council from 18 to 30. Opposition was reduced from 15 in 2011 to three in 2015.

Ward results

Benson and Crowmarsh

Berinsfield

Chalgrove

Chinnor

Cholsey

Didcot North East

Didcot South

Didcot West

Forest Hill and Holton

Garsington and Horspath

Goring

Haseley Brook

Henley-on-Thames

Kidmore End and Whitchurch

Sandford and the Wittenhams

Sonning Common

Thame

Wallingford

Watlington

Wheatley

Woodcote and Rotherfield

References

2010s in Oxfordshire
2015 English local elections
May 2015 events in the United Kingdom
2015